Mugumu is a town in Mara Region, Tanzania. It is the administrative seat of Serengeti District. 

According to the 2012 census, the population of Mugumu town (Mugumu and Stendi Kuu Wards) is 16,851.

There are plans to build a new international airport in Mugumu town, to boost the number of visitors to Serengeti National Park.

References

Populated places in Mara Region